In logic, especially mathematical logic, a signature lists and describes the  non-logical symbols of a formal language. In universal algebra, a signature lists the operations that characterize an algebraic structure. In model theory, signatures are used for both purposes. They are rarely made explicit in more philosophical treatments of logic.

Definition

 function symbols,
 s or predicates,
 constant symbols,
and a function  which assigns a natural number called arity to every function or relation symbol. A function or relation symbol is called -ary if its arity is  Some authors define a nullary (-ary) function symbol as constant symbol, otherwise constant symbols are defined separately.

More generally, the cardinality of a signature  is defined as 

The  is the set of all well formed sentences built from the symbols in that signature together with the symbols in the logical system.

Other conventions

However, the cardinality of the language  will always be infinite; if  is finite then  will be .

As the formal definition is inconvenient for everyday use, the definition of a specific signature is often abbreviated in an informal way, as in:

"The standard signature for abelian groups is  where  is a unary operator."

Sometimes an algebraic signature is regarded as just a list of arities, as in:

"The similarity type for abelian groups is "

In mathematical logic, very often symbols are not allowed to be nullary, so that constant symbols must be treated separately rather than as nullary function symbols. However, this only serves to complicate matters, especially in proofs by induction over the structure of a formula, where an additional case must be considered. Any nullary relation symbol, which is also not allowed under such a definition, can be emulated by a unary relation symbol together with a sentence expressing that its value is the same for all elements. This translation fails only for empty structures (which are often excluded by convention). If nullary symbols are allowed, then every formula of propositional logic is also a formula of first-order logic.

Use of signatures in logic and algebra

In the context of first-order logic, the symbols in a signature are also known as the non-logical symbols, because together with the logical symbols they form the underlying alphabet over which two formal languages are inductively defined: The set of terms over the signature and the set of (well-formed) formulas over the signature.

In a structure, an interpretation ties the function and relation symbols to mathematical objects that justify their names: The interpretation of an -ary function symbol  in a structure  with domain  is a function  and the interpretation of an -ary relation symbol is a relation  Here  denotes the -fold cartesian product of the domain  with itself, and so  is in fact an -ary function, and  an -ary relation.

Many-sorted signatures

For many-sorted logic and for many-sorted structures signatures must encode information about the sorts. The most straightforward way of doing this is via  that play the role of generalized arities.

Symbol types

Let  be a set (of sorts) not containing the symbols  or 

Signature

A (many-sorted) signature is a triple  consisting of
 a set  of sorts,
 a set  of symbols, and
 a map  which associates to every symbol in  a symbol type over

See also

Notes

References

  Free online edition.

External links

 Stanford Encyclopedia of Philosophy: "Model theory"—by Wilfred Hodges.
 PlanetMath: Entry "Signature" describes the concept for the case when no sorts are introduced.
 Baillie, Jean, "An Introduction to the Algebraic Specification of Abstract Data Types."

Mathematical logic
Model theory
Universal algebra